Tariqabad railway station is  located in Tariqabad, Faisalabad District, Punjab, Pakistan.

See also
 List of railway stations in Pakistan
 Pakistan Railways

References

Railway stations in Faisalabad District